David Lean (David Francis Lean; born 22 August 1935 in Tasmania) was an Australian athlete who competed mainly in the 440-yard hurdles and 4 × 440-yard relay.

He competed for Australia at the 1956 Summer Olympics held in Melbourne, Australia in the 4 × 400 metre relay where he won the Silver medal with his team mates Graham Gipson, Leon Gregory and Kevan Gosper.   He also regularly competed in the 440 yard hurdles, winning gold at the 1954 British Empire and Commonwealth Games, silver at the 1958 British Empire and Commonwealth Games, fifth at the Melbourne Olympic games and winning the Australian national championship in 1954.  His gold medal at the 1954 Vancouver Games was only his eighth race over the distance and the first ever international victory by a Tasmanian athlete.

Lean attended Launceston Grammar School where he mainly raced over 100 yards and later attended Michigan State University where he also competed in 440 and 880 yard races.

References

Living people
1935 births
Sportsmen from Tasmania
Australian male sprinters
Australian male hurdlers
Olympic athletes of Australia
Olympic silver medalists for Australia
Commonwealth Games medallists in athletics
Commonwealth Games gold medallists for Australia
Commonwealth Games silver medallists for Australia
Athletes (track and field) at the 1954 British Empire and Commonwealth Games
Athletes (track and field) at the 1956 Summer Olympics
Athletes (track and field) at the 1958 British Empire and Commonwealth Games
Medalists at the 1956 Summer Olympics
Olympic silver medalists in athletics (track and field)
Medallists at the 1954 British Empire and Commonwealth Games
Medallists at the 1958 British Empire and Commonwealth Games